The tourist attractions of Vienna concentrate in three distinct areas. The largest cluster, centred on Schönbrunn Palace, attracted around five million visitors in 2009, down from six million in 2008. Museums and exhibitions of Hofburg Palace accounted for nearly two million visitors in 2008, with a significant decline in 2009. The third, and the newest, cluster of modern art museums in Museumsquartier attracted less than one million visitors. Nearby duo of Kunsthistorisches and Naturhistorisches museums, located halfway between Museumsquartier and Hofburg, also reported around one million visitors. The Landstraße district, which lies south-east of the old city, is home to art exhibitions at the Belvedere Palace and the KunstHausWien.

Vienna stands out among other European tourist destinations for being a "new old city", a city in transition from an older "picture city" like Florence and Venice to being a global city like Paris and London. For six consecutive years, 2003–2008, tourism industry was on the rise, but in 2009 the global financial crisis caused a sharp decline, especially in long-distance tourism from Asia and North America. The new museums of modern art retained or even increased their attendance, but museums of classical art lost more than a third of their former ticket sales. According to preliminary data for the first half of 2010, Vienna is already past the bottom of the crisis and visitor numbers are rising again. In 2013, Vienna was ranked the world’s most livable city for the fifth consecutive year, playing host to 5.8 million tourists, a growth of over four percent as compared to 2012.

Effects of the global crisis

In 2003–2008 the Austrian tourism industry enjoyed a six-year streak of growth, with each year beating the previous record by an average 2.1%. Tourism generated 8.4% of Austrian gross domestic product (23.6 billion Euros) and provided 181 thousand jobs. The "top ten" of Vienna's tourist attractions in this period included the Schönbrunn Palace, Tiergarten Schönbrunn, the Albertina, the Wiener Riesenrad, the Hofburg Palace museums, the Belvedere, the Kunsthistorisches and Naturhistorisches museums, the KunstHausWien and the Donauturm observation deck.

In 2008, the effects of the unfolding global financial crisis on the economy were more than offset by a boost from the UEFA Euro 2008. The number of tourists reached an all-time high, although during the tournament itself museum attendance dropped by 60%, and theatres cancelled their shows altogether. The crisis hit the Austrian tourist industry in the first quarter of 2009, when international tourist arrivals dropped by 8.6%. Museum attendance suffered disproportionately higher losses. Ticket sales at Hofburg palace exhibitions dropped by 20%. Tickets sales at the Albertina, the most visited art collection in Vienna, dropped by more than a third, from 997 thousand in 2008 to 630 thousand in 2009. Its former third place in the list of Viennese attractions was taken over by the Wiener Riesenrad. The Schönbrunn Palace also recorded a drop in visitors, but its profits actually increased by a third. Tiergarten Schönbrunn reported a "record drop" of 70% in February 2009 (50% for the first quarter of 2009). Practically all museums and zoos increased ticket prices, by an average of 16.7%, the first price hike since the introduction of the Euro in 2002.

According to the Vienna Tourist Board, in 2009 the city's hotels recorded 4.385 million visitors (2008: 4.593 million). 20% of the visitors were Austrians, 24% were Germans, 5% Italians and 5% Americans. The worst losses were recorded among tourists from Asia, North America and Eastern Europe.  The state responded with promoting Austria in the neighbouring countries to compensate the losses in long-distance international tourism. In the end of 2009, the trend reversed with an increase in tourists from Japan, Italy, Spain, Greece and Russia. Recovery continued in the first half of 2010. Schönbrunn Palace recorded a 5% increase in ticket sales compared to the first half of 2009, Hofburg had a twelve per cent increase.

Ranking of tourist attractions

Annual rankings of tourist attractions are compiled and published by the Vienna Tourist Board (German: Wiener Tourismusverband). The underlying tickets sales statistics counts all visitors, tourists and Viennese natives, together. Freely accessible landmarks are omitted from the statistics altogether. The symbol of Vienna, St. Stephen's Cathedral, ranks only seventeenth: the number (218,000 visitors in 2009) represents sales of tickets to its underground crypts, but access to the cathedral itself is free.

The Schönbrunn Palace counts each entry by a holder of a multi-entry ticket as a separate visit. Thus, for example, in 2008 it sold 1.98 million tickets, but reported 2.581 million entries. The Palmenhaus and the Wüstenhaus, tropical landscape exhibits in the historic greenhouses of Tiergarten Schönbrunn, are counted as separate tourist attractions. The three Hofburg exhibitions (the Imperial Apartments, Sisi Museum and the Imperial Silver collection) are usually visited as a package, and each combo ticket is counted as one visit.

See also

Museums in Vienna not included in the 2009 top thirty ranking:

 Architekturzentrum Wien
 Museum of Art Fakes
 Austrian Theatre Museum
 Ephesos Museum in Hofburg
 Museum of Ethnology in Hofburg

 Judenplatz Holocaust Memorial
 Kunsthalle Wien
 Bestattungsmuseum Wien
 Vienna Künstlerhaus
 Liechtenstein Museum

 Jewish Museum Vienna
 Museum of the Vienna Secession
 Sigmund Freud Museum
 Vienna Museum (group)

Other Attractions

Bohemian Prater a historical but still functioning amusement park.

Notes

References

Sources
 Mazanec, Josef; Wober, Karl (2009). Analysing International City Tourism. Springer. .
 OECD (2010). OECD Tourism Trends and Policies 2010. OECD Publishing. .

External links
 
 Vienna Online City of Vienna's Official Online Travel Guide in English
 Vienna Tourist Board: Statistics

 
Vienna
Vienna
Vienna-related lists